It Could Be You is a 1956-1961 American game show hosted by Bill Leyden.

It Could Be You may also refer to:

Film and television
It Could Be You (Australian game show), a 1960s game show hosted by Tommy Hanlon, Jr.
It Could Be You (film), a 2005 British film featuring Ameet Chana
"It Could Be You", an episode of the MTV documentary series True Life

Music
"It Could Be You", a song by Blur from The Great Escape
"It Could Be You", a song by Def Leppard from On Through the Night
"It Could Be You", a song by Fischer-Z from Fish's Head
"It Could Be You", a song by Selwyn from One Way
"It Could Be You (Instead of Him)", a song by Johnny Cash from Songs of Our Soil

See also 
It Could Be Yours (disambiguation)